Aiwan may refer to:
Eyvan, a city in Iran
Shalimar Gardens (Lahore), Pakistan